Karate began in the 14th century on the island of Okinawa. Karate as a word first emerged due to Gichin Funakoshi.
Karate was introduced to mainland Japan in the 1920s.

History
Karate (lit. "empty-hand") has its roots in ancient martial practice in India and China. There is a popular tale of an Indian monk by the name of Bodhidharma, who brought a system of exercise and fighting techniques to the Shaolin Monastery in China around 525 A.D. It is said that this was the beginning of a systematized martial practice that eventually spread to other Asian countries via traveling monks and traders.

Karate itself was born in Okinawa (actually a string of islands off the coast of Japan known as the Ryukyu Islands). It is said that in ancient times a style known simply as "te" (literally "hand") emerged from the influence of the aforementioned Shaolin Kung Fu.

In the 1920s a public school teacher named Gichin Funakoshi introduced what was, by then, called kara-te into mainland Japan. He developed the nomenclature of this art at the research club in Keio University, changing the meaning of its name from "Chinese hand" to "empty hand" and adding the suffix do to conform budō arts. In 1933, the art was officially recognized by the Dai Nippon Butoku Kai.

There were already family styles of karate in Okinawa and soon several styles were also formed in Japan. There are several differences between the two traditional approaches but that can be researched elsewhere.

Establishing organizations
Organizations like Japan Karate Association and the Japan Karate Federation emerged in the 1950s to standardize karate as a sport.

National board
Japan Karate Federation is the largest Karate Association in Japan. It is a member of the Japan Olympic Association.

The Japan Karate Federation  is a member of the Asian umbrella organization Asian Karatedo Federation (AKF) as well as the World Association for World Karate Federation (WKF).

On the part of the Japan Olympic Committee, the JOC is the only Karate Association authorized to send athletes to the Olympic Games.

International competition
Japan a traditional world power in Sport Karate and its record in Karate World Championships is an impressive one.

Karate World Championships

Spreading the martial art
As Karate grained prominence in Japan many karate masters exported the martial art to the United States and many other parts of the world.

Present
The sport has declined in popularity and is more popular abroad. Karate at the 2020 Summer Olympics is going to be a debut event at the Summer Olympics.

See also

References

External links
Okinawa Karate Kaikan